Daniel Cingolani (born May 28, 1961, in Buenos Aires Province), is an Argentine racing driver. He won the TC2000 championship in 2000.

References

1961 births
Living people
Formula 3 Sudamericana drivers
Argentine racing drivers
Turismo Carretera drivers
Formula Renault Argentina drivers